Now (sometimes also Now: A Celebratory 50th Anniversary Album) is a studio album by American singer Dionne Warwick. It was released by H&I Music Productions on 	November 6, 2012 in the United States. Released to mark Warwick's 50th anniversary as a recording artist, the album is a retrospective collection of new recordings of her Burt Bacharach and Hal David classics as well as four new tracks. Now peaked at number 57 on the UK Albums Chart and received a Grammy Award nomination in the Best Traditional Pop Vocal Album category in 2014.

Critical reception

Allmusic editor Mark Deming wrote that "the album is lushly produced by Phil Ramone, with arrangements that suggest smooth jazz rather than the adult but AM-friendly pop of Warwick's heyday, and the accompaniment, expert as it may be, tends to buff down the emotional edges that made these songs so satisfying, and blunting their melodic ingenuity. The new songs are serviceable, but they don't match the high standard of the classics featured elsewhere on the album; however, Warwick is at her best on the fresher material, where she shows she's still a song stylist of considerable talent and keen instincts."

Track listing 
All tracks produced by Phil Ramone.

Charts

Release history

References 

Dionne Warwick albums
2011 albums
albums produced by Phil Ramone